The Four Beauties or Four Great Beauties are four Chinese women who were renowned for their beauty. The four are usually identified as Xi Shi, Wang Zhaojun, Diaochan, and Yang Guifei. The scarcity of historical records concerning them meant that much of what is known of them today has been greatly embellished by legend. They all were said to have in some manner caught the attention of a ruling king or emperor in their respective eras. They gained their reputation from the influence they exercised over kings and emperors and, consequently, the way their actions impacted Chinese history. Three of the Four Beauties brought kingdoms to their knees and their lives ended in tragedy.

Background
One of the earliest references to qualities later associated with the canonical Four Great Beauties appears in the Zhuangzi. In one chapter, the women Mao Qiang and Lady Li are described as "great beauties" who "when fish see them they dart into the depths, when birds see them they soar into the skies, when deer see them they bolt away without looking back". This passage is the source of the well-known Chinese idiom "to make fish sink and birds alight", which refers to feminine beauty (see 沉魚落雁).

Xi Shi
Xi Shi lived around the 7th to the 6th centuries BCE, during the Spring and Autumn period. Similar to the story in the Zhuangzi, she was said to be so entrancingly beautiful that fish would forget how to swim and sink below the surface upon seeing her reflection in the water. Xi Shi was from Zhuji, the capital of the Ancient Yue Kingdom. Goujian, the King of Yue, had surrendered to the rival state of Wu, with the aim of biding his time before enacting his revenge. Part of his plan was to dispatch Xi Shi as a gift to Fuchai, the King of Wu, in the hope that Fuchai would become infatuated with her and become distracted from his official duties. The plan was successful, with Fuchai spending all his time entertaining Xi Shi and not attending to military matters. In part due to his distraction, Goujian was able to defeat an unprepared Fuchai in battle. Fuchai, full of regret, committed suicide. There are two accounts of what then happened to Xi Shi. The first is that Goujian killed her by drowning her because he was afraid that he too would be mesmerized by her beauty. The second was that she eventually came together with her lover Fan Li and they lived in seclusion together.

Wang Zhaojun
Wang Zhaojun was born around 50 BCE, during the Western Han dynasty. Again reflecting the Zhuangzi, she was said to be so beautiful that her appearance would entice birds in flight to fall from the sky. Locally renowned for her beauty and skill at playing the pipa, she was chosen to be admitted into the harem of Emperor Yun, despite her young age. Despite her beauty, the emperor never visited her, as she had refused to bribe the official portraitists, who had then painted an unflattering portrait of her. In 33 BCE, the Xiongnu Chanyu Huhanye came to the Han capital Chang'an on an official visit, and asked for a Han beauty as his wife as part of the marriage alliance system between the Han dynasty and the Xiongnu. The new emperor, Emperor Huan, ordered that the plainest woman from the harem be given to Huhanye, and so Wang Zhaojun was chosen, based on her unflattering portrait. The artist Mao Yanshou was subsequently executed for deceiving the Emperor.

Diaochan
Diaochan lived during the waning years of the Eastern Han and the subsequent Three Kingdoms period. She was said to be so luminously lovely that the moon itself would shy away in embarrassment when compared to her face. Chinese historical records indicate that the warrior Lü Bu had a secret affair with one of the warlord Dong Zhuo's maids and he constantly feared that Dong Zhuo would find out. This was one of the reasons why he betrayed and assassinated Dong Zhuo in 192. However, the maid's name was not recorded in history. In later retellings, such as the Ming novel Romance of the Three Kingdoms, this woman is called Diaochan, and fictional details about her life were added over the centuries.

Yang Guifei
Yang Guifei lived in the 8th century, and was the beloved consort of Emperor Xuanzong of Tang. She was said to have a face that puts all flowers to shame. Emperor Xuanzong doted on her so much that she was able to persuade him to make her cousin, Yang Guozhong, leading chancellor. During the An Lushan Rebellion, as Emperor Xuanzong and his cortege were fleeing from the capital Chang'an to Chengdu, the emperor's guards demanded that he put Yang Guifei to death because they blamed the rebellion on her cousin Yang Guozhong and the rest of her family. The emperor capitulated and reluctantly ordered his attendant Gao Lishi to strangle Yang to death. Yang Guifei became a tragic figure in later depictions. Particularly influential was the Tang poet Bai Juyi's long poem, "Chang hen ge" ("Song of Everlasting Sorrow").

Idioms
Well-known idioms describe the Four Beauties.  The exact origin of these idioms is debated.

These separate idioms are sometimes merged to describe especially beautiful women or simply to refer to the Four Beauties' legendary good looks.

See also
Bao Si

References

Lists of Chinese people
Lists of women
Chinese culture
Female beauty
Articles about multiple people in pre-Tang China
Quartets
Chinese concubines
Sexuality in China